Pervomaysky is a rural locality (a settlement) in Krasnoye Rural Settlement, Sredneakhtubinsky District, Volgograd Oblast, Russia. The population was 451 as of 2010. There are 16 streets.

Geography 
Pervomaysky is located 9 km southeast of Srednyaya Akhtuba (the district's administrative centre) by road. Kuybyshev is the nearest rural locality.

References 

Rural localities in Sredneakhtubinsky District